39th National Board of Review Awards
December 31, 1967
The 39th National Board of Review Awards were announced on December 31, 1967.

Top Ten Films 
Far from the Madding Crowd
The Whisperers
Ulysses
In Cold Blood
The Family Way
The Taming of the Shrew
Doctor Dolittle
The Graduate
The Comedians
Accident

Top Foreign Films 
Elvira Madigan
The Hunt
Africa Addio
Persona
 (The Great British Train Robbery)

Winners 
Best Film: Far from the Madding Crowd
Best Foreign Film: Elvira Madigan
Best Actor: Peter Finch (Far from the Madding Crowd)
Best Actress: Edith Evans (The Whisperers)
Best Supporting Actor: Paul Ford (The Comedians)
Best Supporting Actress: Marjorie Rhodes (The Family Way)
Best Director: Richard Brooks (In Cold Blood)

External links 
 National Board of Review of Motion Pictures :: Awards for 1967

1967
National Board of Review Awards 
National Board of Review Awards
National Board of Review Awards